In the United States the right to petition is enumerated in the First Amendment to the United States Constitution, which specifically prohibits Congress from abridging "the right of the people peaceably to assemble, and to petition the Government for a redress of grievances".

Although often overlooked in favor of other more famous freedoms, and sometimes taken for granted, many other civil liberties are enforceable against the government only by exercising this basic right.

According to the Congressional Research Service, since the Constitution was written,
 the right of petition has expanded. It is no longer confined to demands for “a redress of grievances,” in any accurate meaning of these words, but comprehends demands for an exercise by the government of its powers in furtherance of the interest and prosperity of the petitioners and of their views on politically contentious matters. The right extends to the "approach of citizens or groups of them to administrative agencies (which are both creatures of the legislature, and arms of the executive) and to courts, the third branch of Government. Certainly the right to petition extends to all departments of the Government. The right of access to the courts is indeed but one aspect of the right of petition."

Historic roots
In [[Commentaries on the Laws of England|Blackstone's Commentaries]], Americans in the Thirteen Colonies read that "the right of petitioning the king, or either house of parliament, for the redress of grievances" was a "right appertaining to every individual".

In 1776, the Declaration of Independence cited King George's failure to redress the grievances listed in colonial petitions, such as the Olive Branch Petition of 1775, as a justification to declare independence:

In every stage of these Oppressions We have Petitioned for Redress in the most humble terms: Our repeated Petitions have been answered only by repeated injury.  A Prince, whose character is thus marked by every act which may define a Tyrant, is unfit to be the ruler of a free people.

Historically, the right can be traced back to English documents such as Magna Carta, which, by its acceptance by the monarchy, implicitly affirmed the right. 14 Edw III Statute 1 Chapter 5 (1340) put petitioning on a formal statutory footing. It required that a Commission be provided at every Parliament to "hear by petition delivered to them, the Complaints of all those that will complain them of such Delays or Grievances done to them".

Then later, Article 5 Bill of Rights 1689, which explicitly declared the "That it is the Right of the Subjects to petition the King and all Commitments and Prosecutions for such Petitioning are Illegall.".. "Redress of grievances", found in the petitioning clause of the US First Amendment is found in Article 13 of the 1689 Bill of Rights "And that for Redresse of all Grievances and for the amending strengthening and preserveing of the Lawes Parlyaments ought to be held frequently." indicating that the right to petition is cognate with the right to redress of grievance in Parliament. Similar clauses are found in Scotland's Petition of Rights.

Prince William of Orange (Future King William III) described in his Declaration of Reason the grievances that would result in the 1688 Bill of Rights. Regarding the right to petition he referenced the Trial of the Seven Bishops where the Lords Spiritual including the Arch Bishop of Canterbury were committed to the Tower and tried for Seditious Libel for refusing to obey orders to read a Declaration of Indulgence. They were tried and acquitted by jury. It was found that the Bishops could not be convicted of Seditious Libel because they were exercising a right to petition that was contained then within the 1661 Tumultuous Petitioning Act.

In reference to violation of the right to petition, the Prince of Orange had the following to say in his Declaration of Reason, "And yet it cannot be pretended, that any Kings, how great soever their Power has been, and how arbitrary and despotick soever they have been in the Exercise of it, have ever reckoned it a Crime for their Subjects to come, in all Submission and Respect, and in a due Number not exceeding the Limits of the Law, and represent to them the Reasons that made it impossible for them to obey their Orders." Reference here to numbers refers to limits to the number that could assemble to petition found in the 1661 Tumultuous Petitioning Act. The 1688 Bill of Rights provides no such limitation to assembly. Under the common law, the right of an individual to petition implies the right of multiple individuals to assemble lawfully for that purpose. England's implied right to assemble to petition was made an express right in the US First Amendment.

The Trial of the Seven Bishops also caused Art.1 Bill of Rights (1688), which declared that such suspension of a laws without consent of Parliament, regardless of "plausible pretext" is recognised as being illegal "That the pretended Power of Suspending of Laws or the Execution of Laws by Regall Authority without Consent of Parlyament is illegall." The Prince of Orange had the following to say about arbitrary rule (dictatorship) in his Declaration of Reason, "that the King can intirely suspend the Execution of those Laws relating to Treason or Felony, unless it is pretended, that he is cloathed with a despotick and arbitrary Power, and that the Lives, Liberties, Honours, and Estates of the Subjects, depend wholly on his goodwill and Pleasure, and are intirely subject to him; which must infallibly follow on the King's having a Power to suspend the Execution of Laws, and to dispense with them."First use
The first significant exercise and defense of the right to petition within the U.S. was to advocate the end of slavery by sending Congress well over a thousand petitions on the topic, signed by some 130,000 citizens. Starting in 1836, the House of Representatives adopted a series of gag rules that automatically tabled indefinitely all such anti-slavery petitions, and prohibited their discussion. The Senate took similar action. Former president John Quincy Adams and other Representatives eventually achieved repeal of these rules in 1844 on the basis that it was contrary to the Constitutional right (in the First Amendment) to "petition the government for the redress of grievances".

Scope
While the prohibition of abridgment of the right to petition originally referred only to the federal legislature (the Congress) and courts, the incorporation doctrine later expanded the protection of the right to its current scope, over all state and federal courts and legislatures and the executive branches of the state and federal governments.  The right to petition includes under its umbrella the legal right to sue the government,. Also civil litigation between two private individuals or entities is considered to be a right to a peititon, since they are asking the government's court system to remedy their problems.

Some define lobbying as any kind of persuading of a public official and say that petitioning includes it. Others say the petition clause gives no right to lobby. Lobbying includes approaching a public official in secret, possibly giving them money. But petitioning, as America's founders knew it, was a public process, involving no money.

Some litigants have contended that the right to petition the government includes a requirement that the government listen to or respond to members of the public. This view was rejected by the United States Supreme Court in 1984:

Nothing in the First Amendment or in this Court's case law interpreting it suggests that the rights to speak, associate, and petition require government policymakers to listen or respond to communications of members of the public on public issues.

See also Smith v. Arkansas State Highway Employees, where the U.S. Supreme Court ruled that the Arkansas State Highway Commission's refusal to consider employee grievances when filed by the union, rather than directly by an employee of the State Highway Department, did not violate the First Amendment to the United States Constitution.

The Supreme Court has largely interpreted the Petition Clause as coextensive with the Free Speech Clause of the First Amendment, but in its 2010 decision in Borough of Duryea v. Guarnieri (2010) it acknowledged that there may be differences between the two:

Restrictions
The law of South Dakota prohibits sex offenders from circulating petitions, carrying a maximum potential sentence of one year in jail and a $2,000 fine.

Circulation of a petition by a prisoner in Federal Bureau of Prisons (BOP) is a prohibited act under ,Duamutef v. O'Keefe, 98 F.3d 22 (2d Cir. 1996) and is punishable by solitary confinement.

The term "Petition" as used in both of these regulations is restricted to those petitions which are directed at the executive or legislative branches of government, and does not include documents filed in a court of law, which are also referred to as "petitions", such as petitions for coram nobis, mandamus, habeas corpus, prohibition, and certiorari, among others. While these are commonly referred to as a "petition" they are forms of civil action against the government that may result in the courts issuing a writ directing the government to act, or refrain from acting, in a specified manner.

The right of government employees to address grievances with their employer over work-related matters can be restricted to administrative processes under Supreme Court precedent. In Pickering v. Board of Education, the Supreme Court decided that the court must balance the employee's right to engage in speech against the government's interest in being efficient and effective in the public services it performs. Later Supreme Court precedent—Connick v. Myers, Garcetti v. Ceballos, and Borough of Duryea v. Guarnieri''—has established that public employees must show they spoke as a citizen on a matter of public concern when suing their employer under the First Amendment's Speech or Petition Clauses.

See also
 We the People (petitioning system)

References

First Amendment to the United States Constitution
Freedom of expression in the United States
Government in the United States
United States